The 1997 Southeastern Conference baseball tournament was the 1997 postseason baseball championship of the NCAA Division I Southeastern Conference, held at Golden Park in Columbus, Georgia, from May 14 through 18.  Alabama defeated LSU in the championship game, earning the conference's automatic bid to the 1997 NCAA Division I baseball tournament.

Format
Eight teams qualified for the league tournament.  The teams seeded fifth through eighth played a single-elimination play-in round.  The two winners of the play-in games advanced to the main bracket, which was a six-team, double-elimination format, the same as the NCAA regional format used through 1998.

Regular season results

†- Vanderbilt forfeited its conference games and tournament berth for using an ineligible player.

Tournament

Play-in games

Main bracket

All-tournament team

See also
College World Series
NCAA Division I Baseball Championship
Southeastern Conference baseball tournament

References

Tournament
Southeastern Conference Baseball Tournament
Southeastern Conference baseball tournament
Southeastern Conference baseball tournament
Baseball competitions in Georgia (U.S. state)
College sports tournaments in Georgia (U.S. state)
Sports in Columbus, Georgia